Ivan Komar (born 18 March 1970) is a retired Belarusian middle-distance runner who competed primarily in the 800 metres. He represented his country at three consecutive World Championships starting in 1993.

Competition record

Personal bests
Outdoor
600 metres – 1:17.69 (Bielsko-Biała 2002)
800 metres – 1:45.63 (Sopot 1999)
1000 metres – 2:19.22 (Stockholm 1999)
Indoor
600 metres – 1:16.76 (1998) NR
800 metres – 1:47.18 (Sindelfingen 1998)
1000 metres – 2:19.27 (Erfurt 1999) NR
1500 metres – 3:43.67 (Moscow 1998)

References

1970 births
Living people
Belarusian male middle-distance runners
World Athletics Championships athletes for Belarus